The 2012 United States House of Representatives elections in Arkansas occurred on Tuesday, November 6, 2012, to elect the four U.S. representatives from the state, one from each of the state's four congressional districts. The elections coincided with the elections of other federal and state offices, including a quadrennial presidential election.

As the result of redistricting following the 2010 United States census, the boundaries of the state's congressional districts have been redrawn. Governor Mike Beebe, who signed the new map into law in April 2011, described it as the "status quo" and not partisan. In the new map, five counties are split between districts, the first time in Arkansas history that counties have not been kept intact in congressional districts.

Overview 
The table below shows the total number and percentage of votes, as well as the number of seats gained and lost by each political party in the election for the United States House of Representatives in Arkansas.

District 1

The 1st district had lost population, and so was drawn in the new map to incorporate counties in southeastern Arkansas which were previously a part of the 4th district. Republican incumbent Rick Crawford was first elected in 2010.

Republican primary

Candidates

Nominee
Rick Crawford, incumbent U.S. Representative

Democratic primary

Candidates

Nominee
Scott Ellington, prosecuting attorney

Eliminated in primary
Clark Hall, state representative
Gary Latanich, professor of economics at Arkansas State University

Declined
Paul Bookout, president pro tempore of the Arkansas Senate;
L. J. Bryant, business owner and nominee for Land Commissioner in 2010 
Chad Causey, former chief of staff to U.S. Representative Marion Berry and nominee for this seat in 2010 
David Cook, former state representative and candidate for this seat in 2010
Keith Ingram, state representative
Robert S. Moore Jr., Speaker of the state house of representatives;
Steve Rockwell, businessman (who had considered running in 2010)
Robert F. Thompson, state senator

Polling

Primary results

Green primary

Candidates

Nominee
Jacob Holloway, graduate student at Arkansas State University.

Libertarian primary

Candidates

Nominee
Jessica Paxton, wife of Libertarian Party of Arkansas chairman Rodger Paxton

General election

Endorsements

Polling

Predictions

Results

District 2

Population growth in Arkansas's central counties meant that the 2nd district had to shrink in the new map. Under the new map, the 2nd district is likely to continue to favor Republicans.

Republican incumbent Timothy Griffin was first elected in 2010.

Republican primary

Candidates

Nominee
Timothy Griffin, incumbent U.S. Representative

Democratic primary

Candidates

Nominee
Herbert Rule, attorney and former state representative

Declined
David Boling, former chief of staff to U.S. Representative Vic Snyder and candidate for this seat in 2010
Bob Edwards, attorney (who had considered running in 2010)
John Charles Edwards, state representative 
Drew Pritt, political consultant
Bill Halter, former Lieutenant Governor of Arkansas and candidate for Senate in 2010
Pat Hays, Mayor of North Little Rock;
David Johnson, state senator
Jay Martin, lawyer and former state representative
Tracy Steele, state representative  
Robbie Wills, former speaker of the state House of Representatives and candidate for this seat in 2010

Libertarian primary

Candidates

Nominee
Chris Hayes

General election

Endorsements

Results

District 3

Population growth in Arkansas's northwestern counties meant that the 3rd district had to shrink in the new map. Under the new map, the 3rd district is likely to continue to favor Republicans.

Republican incumbent Steve Womack was first elected in 2010.

Republican primary

Candidates

Nominee
Steve Womack, incumbent U.S. Representative

Democratic primary

Candidates

Nominee
Ken Aden, former director for West Memphis-based nonprofit Residents 4 Arkansas

Green primary

Candidates

Nominee
Rebekah Kennedy, nominee for Senate in 2008 and for state Attorney General in 2010.

Libertarian primary

Candidates

Nominee
David Pangrac, Libertarian Party of Arkansas Vice Chairman

General election

Campaign
Aden would withdraw from the race after admitting to exaggerating his military record. Under Arkansas law, the Democratic Party was unable to field a replacement candidate for Aden and no Democrat appeared on the general election ballot. On August 14, 2012, Kennedy received the endorsement of the Arkansas state AFL-CIO labor union.

Endorsements

Results

District 4

Under the new map, the 4th district loses some territory in the east of the state to the 1st district and gains some Republican-leaning northwestern Arkansas counties from the 3rd district. The district also gains Yell County from the 2nd district, which is expected to make the 4th district more favorable to Democrats.

Democratic incumbent Mike Ross, who was first elected in 2000, chose not to seek re-election.

Democratic primary

Candidates

Nominee
Gene Jeffress, state senator

Eliminated in primary
D.C. Morrison, businessman and candidate for Senate in 2010
Q. Byrum Hurst Jr., attorney and small business owner

Declined
Robin Carroll, prosecutor and former legal counsel to the Democratic Party; 
Conner Eldridge, the U.S. Attorney for the Western District of Arkansas;
Steve Faris, former state senator
Greg Hale, consultant for The Markham Group;
Steve Harrelson, state senator  
Mike Hathorn, former state representative and candidate for lieutenant governor in 2010 
Carlton Jones, prosecutor from Texarkana
Chris Masingill, head of the Delta Regional Authority and a former staff member for Ross and Governor Mike Beebe
Bruce Maloch, state representative
Gregg Reep, state representative
Mike Ross, incumbent U.S. Representative
Larry Teague, state senator
Chris Thomason, former state representative and chancellor of the University of Arkansas Community College at Hope
Jeff Weaver, district director for Mike Ross
Hank Wilkins, state legislator m

Polling

Primary results

Primary runoff results

Republican primary

Candidates

Nominee
Tom Cotton, consultant and Army reservist

Eliminated in primary
John Cowart, police officer and currently serving U.S. Marine Corps Reserve lieutenant colonel in Afghanistan 
Beth Anne Rankin, teacher, former Miss Arkansas & nominee for this seat in 2010

Withdrew
Marcus Richmond, business owner and retired Marine Corps lieutenant colonel

Polling

Primary results

Green primary

Candidates

Nominee
J. Joshua Drake

Libertarian primary
Bobby Tullis had considered seeking Libertarian nomination for the seat; however in December 2011 Tullis gave his support to Republican candidate Beth Anne Rankin; nevertheless, he was subsequently nominated as the Libertarian candidate.

Candidates

Nominee
Bobby Tullis, former Democratic state representative and unsuccessful Green Party nominee for state treasurer in 2010

General election

Endorsements

Predictions

Results

References

External links
 Elections Division from the Arkansas Secretary of State
 United States House of Representatives elections in Arkansas, 2012 at Ballotpedia
 Campaign contributions at OpenSecrets
 Outside spending at the Sunlight Foundation

Arkansas
2012
United States House of Representatives